Higher school (旧制高等学校, Kyūsei Kōtō Gakkō) was an institution of higher education in Japan, which was a preparatory institution for imperial universities and national medical colleges until the educational reform in occupied Japan. The higher schools have now been converted or mergerd into universities.

List

3-year Schools

Number Schools

Name Schools

Postwar Special Higher School

7-year Schools

See also 

 Imperial Universities (帝国大学)
 Daigaku Yoka (大学予科)
 Specialized School (Japan) (旧制専門学校)

References

External links 

 JAPAN'S MODERN EDUCATIONAL SYSTEM - Government official articles by MEXT, Japan

Boys' schools in Japan